The Midwest Rugby Premiership is a rugby union competition in the United States that serves mainly as the Division I league for the Midwest Conference (National Competitive Region 1), but also includes two teams from the Frontier Conference (American Competitive Region 3). The winner progresses to the national Division I playoffs.

Format
Ten teams are divided into east and west divisions, with each team playing every other team in their group twice (home and away). The season runs from August through November, with the two division winners playing in the final the following May.

Teams

Champions

By Year

External links

Rugby union leagues in the United States